The FIBA Africa Championship 2011 Qualification took place on various dates between 11 August 2010 and mid-2011. It was used to determine which African national basketball teams would qualify for the FIBA Africa Championship 2011. Teams competed with other teams in their respective "zones" for a spot in the Championship tournament.

Qualified Teams
Four teams qualified for the tournament before the qualification round took place.  Twelve more teams claimed spots in the tournament through Zonal Qualifying.  

Qualified as the host nation:
 

Qualified by finishing in the top four at the 2009 FIBA Africa Championship:
 
 
 

Qualified through Zonal Qualifying:

Qualifying round
Zone 1

Qualified before tournament: 
Did Not Participate: 

Zone 2 (Dakar, Senegal, August 11-August 18, 2010)

Senegal and Mali qualified for the tournament.  Senegal qualified for its 25th consecutive appearance.

Zone 3 (Lomé, Togo, August 10-August 16, 2010)

Nigeria and Togo qualify for the 2011 FIBA Africa Championship.  Côte d'Ivoire, which had previously qualified for the tournament as hosts, qualified for the 2010 All-Africa Games by finishing second in the zone.  Togo qualified for the first time since the FIBA Africa Championship 1978.

Zone 4

Qualified before tournament: 

Zone 5

Zone 6

Qualified before tournament: 

Zone 7

Notes

External links
 FIBA Africa

AfroBasket qualification
2010 in African basketball
2011 in African basketball
qualification